

Qualification system
A total of 140 sailors and 85 boats will qualify to compete at the games. A nation may enter a maximum of one boat in each of the ten events and a maximum of eighteen athletes. Each event will have different qualifying events that began in 2013. However on December 22, 2014 the Pan American Sailing Federation announced the total quota was raised to 148 athletes and 93 boats (with the laser and laser standard events each receiving an additional four boats). This was done because the event became an Olympic qualifier.

Qualification summary
The following qualification summary and countries qualified per event are final and as of March 23, 2015.

RS:X men

Laser Standard men

The Dominican Republic declined the quota.

RS:X women

Laser Radial women

49erFX women

Sunfish open

Snipe open

Lightning mixed

Hobie 16 open

J/24 open

References

P
P
P
Qualification for the 2015 Pan American Games
Sailing at the 2015 Pan American Games